The Sto꞉lo Nation Chiefs Council is a First Nations Tribal Council in the Fraser Valley region of the Canadian province of British Columbia that is the tribal council for First Nations band governments in the area of Chilliwack, Abbotsford and at Nicomen Island. This tribal council should not be confused with the Stó:lō Tribal Council, which is composed of different bands of the Stó:lō people. Many Sto:lo communities and their governments are not in either tribal council.

Member governments
Aitchelitz First Nation
Leq'á:mel First Nation
Matsqui First Nation	
Popkum First Nation
Skway First Nation
Skawahlook First Nation 	
Skowkale First Nation 	
Squiala First Nation 	
Sumas First Nation 	
Tzeachten First Nation
Yakweakwioose First Nation

History
In 1977 twenty-four Stó:lō First Nations banded together to sign the Stó:lō Declaration and creating the Stó:lō Nation Chiefs Council. By 1995 when the BC Treaty Process started three First Nations had left the Sto:lo Nation. By 2005 two more nations had left leaving 19 First Nations.

In 2005, these 19 Sto:lo First Nations that remained in the Sto:lo Nation underwent an internal re-organization, eventually forming two tribal councils. Eleven of these First Nations stayed in the Sto:lo Nation Chiefs Council: Aitchelitz, Leq'a:mel, Matsqui, Popkum, Shxwhá:y Village, Skawahlook, Skowkale, Squiala, Sumas, Tzeachten, and Yakweakwioose.

Eight others formed a new tribal council called the Sto:lo Tribal Council:

Chawathil First Nation
Cheam Indian Band
Kwantlen First Nation
Kwaw-kwaw-Apilt First Nation
Scowlitz First Nation
Seabird Island First Nation
Shxw'ow'hamel First Nation
Soowahlie First Nation

Language

See also
Stó꞉lō Tribal Council
Stolo
Halkomelem
List of tribal councils in British Columbia

References

External links
Sto:lo Nation website

Sto:lo
First Nations tribal councils in British Columbia
Lower Mainland